Micheline Aharonian Marcom (born 1968) is an American novelist.

Life and work
Micheline Aharonian Marcom was born in Dhahran, Saudi Arabia in 1968 to an American father and an Armenian-Lebanese mother. She grew up in Los Angeles, but as a child in the years before the Lebanese Civil War, she spent summers in Beirut with her mother's family.

Her first book and the beginning of a trilogy of novels, Three Apples Fell from Heaven (2001), is set in Turkey between 1915–1917 and depicts the Ottoman government's genocide of the Armenian population. It was named one of the best books of the year by both The Washington Post and the Los Angeles Times. Her second book in the trilogy, The Daydreaming Boy (2004), which earned her the 2004 Lannan Literary Fellowship as well as the 2005 PEN/USA Award for Fiction, is centered on a middle-aged survivor of the genocide living in a 1960s Beirut which itself is facing collapse. The culmination of the trilogy, Draining the Sea (2008), is a critique of America's complicit involvement in the Guatemalan Civil War.

Marcom's fourth novel — whose original title “The Edge of Love" was a reference to Clarice Lispector's story That’s Where I’m Going — was published by Dalkey Archive Press as The Mirror in the Well (2008).

Her fifth book, A Brief History of Yes, was published in 2013 by Dalkey Archive Press.

Her sixth book, The Brick House, was published in 2017 by Awst Press.

The New American, her seventh novel, about a DREAMer who is deported to Guatemala and makes his way home to California, was published in 2020.

In 2008, Marcom taught at Haigazian University in Beirut on a Fulbright Fellowship. She is a professor of Creative Writing at the University of Virginia.

Awards
 2022 Finalist Neustadt International Prize for Literature
 2012 United States Artists Fellow  
 2006 Whiting Award
 2005 PEN/USA Award for Fiction
 2004 Lannan Foundation Literary Fellowship

Publications
 
 
 
 
 A Brief History of Yes. Dalkey Archive Press. 2013. 
 The Brick House. Awst Press. 2017. 
 The New American. Simon & Schuster. 2020. 
 Small Pieces, Dalkey Archive Press. 2023. ISBN 978-1628974508

References

External links
Author's website
Interview, KCRW
"Interview with Micheline Aharonian Marcom," Shushan Avagyan, Context N°22, Dalkey Archive Press, University of Illinois, Urbana-Champaign
Profile at The Whiting Foundation
"(Un)Disciplining Traumatic Memory: Mission Orphanages and the Afterlife of Genocide in Micheline Aharonian Marcom’s The Daydreaming Boy," Rebecca Saunders and Shushan Avagyan, Contemporary Women's Writing 2010, Oxford Journals
Music & Literature Magazine, Issue 1/Fall 2012, Section 3: On Micheline Aharonian Marcom

Mills College alumni
Mills College faculty
20th-century American novelists
21st-century American novelists
American women novelists
American writers of Armenian descent
1968 births
Living people
People from Dhahran
Academic staff of Haigazian University
20th-century American women writers
21st-century American women writers
University of Virginia faculty
American women academics